The Kership class is a range of steel monohull offshore patrol vessels (OPVs) built by Kership, a joint venture of French civil shipbuilder Piriou (55%) and Naval shipbuilder DCNS (45%).

History 
The ships were originally part of the  but after a rearrangement of products DCNS decided to remove the OPV from the Gowind class and develop the OPVs as a class of their own with  top of the range. To do so it formed the Kership joint venture with the Piriou shipyard in Concarneau, Brittany in May 2013 to build and market lightly armed and armoured OPVs for customs, fishing and other home security missions. DCNS said this would enable it to concentrate on "developing relations" with clients seeking, heavily armed and armoured warships while Kership handles the more civilian-standard OPVs.

Vessels

Argentina (was France)
On 9 May 2010, DCNS started the building of one self-funded 1,410t Gowind patrol corvette called L'Adroit and announced that the craft will be made available to the French Navy between 2012 and 2015. Missions include special forces deployment by launching within 5 minutes and recovering two UFAST UFR 9.30 rigid-hulled inflatable boats from a stern ramp. It was sold to Argentina in 2018 and commissioned as ARA Bouchard.

Gabon 
On 29 October 2014, Ernest Mphouho Epigat, defence minister for the Gabonese Republic signed a contract with Piriou  to supply two offshore patrol vessels to the Gabonese Navy. One was to be of the Kership design. The unnamed vessel was called OPV50 by Piriou.

Specifications 
 Length overall 58.20 m
 Beam 9.50 m
 Draught 2.70 m
 Speed 21 kn
 Range 5,000 NM at 12 kn
 Hull / superstructure steel / aluminium
 Accommodation capacity 36 pers. 
– crew 28 pers. 
– special personnel 8 pers. 
 Weaponry 
– 1 x 20 mm gun on the fore-deck
– 2 x 12.7 mm machine guns

References

Patrol vessels of Gabon
Patrol ship classes